Franciscan Province of the Most Holy Redeemer is a province of the Order of the Friars Minor (Franciscans) of the Catholic Church based in Split, Croatia which is active in Dalmatia, Croatia.

The province is one of the original Franciscan provinces founded in the Croatian lands in the Middle Ages. In 1735, when the area was divided between the Kingdom of Hungary, the Ottoman Empire and the Venetian Republic, that province was split, and the latter was named the Province of Pope Caius. In 1743, it was renamed to the current name.

The province has monasteries throughout Dalmatia as well as one in Zagreb and one in Munich.

They run the Franciscan Grammar School of Sinj (a high school) and a seminary, also in Sinj.

The province has maintained a publishing activity for over half a century, publishing Vjesnik since 1951, Služba Božja since 1961, Kačić since 1966.

References

External links 
  

Catholic Church in Croatia
Christianity in Munich
Most Holy Redeemer